Russula laeta is a brittle gill species that was first described by Julius Schäffer in 1952. This species is critically endangered in Belgium.

References

laeta
Edible fungi
Fungi described in 1952
Fungi of Europe